White propaganda is propaganda that does not hide its origin or nature. It is the most common type of propaganda and is distinguished from black propaganda which disguises its origin to discredit an opposing cause.

It typically uses standard public relations techniques and one-sided presentation of an argument.  In some languages the word "propaganda" does not have a negative connotation. For example, the Russian word, propaganda (пропаганда) has a neutral connotation, similar to the English word "promotion" (of an opinion or argument). Jacques Ellul, in one of the major books on the subject of propaganda, Propaganda: The Formation of Men's Attitudes, mentions white propaganda as an acknowledgment of the awareness of the public of attempts being made to influence it. In some states there is a Ministry of Propaganda, for instance; in such a case, one admits that propaganda is being made, its source is known, and its aims and intentions are identified. Throughout the course of a propaganda campaign, however, white propaganda may serve as a cover for black propaganda when the propagandist seeks to mask the latter.

See also 
 Gray propaganda
 Official history
 Operation Mockingbird

References

External links 
 On The Craft of Intelligence , Frank G. Wisner, CIA, 22 SEPT 93

Propaganda techniques